"The Wayfaring Stranger" (also known as "Poor Wayfaring Stranger" or "I Am a Poor Wayfaring Stranger"), Roud 3339, is a well-known American folk and gospel song likely originating in the early 19th century about a plaintive soul on the journey through life. As with most folk songs, many variations of the lyrics exist and many versions of this song have been published over time by popular singers, often being linked to times of hardship and notable experiences in the singers' lives, such as the case with Burl Ives' autobiography.

According to the book The Makers of the Sacred Harp, by David Warren Steel and Richard H. Hulan, the lyrics were published in 1858 in Joseph Bever's Christian Songster, which was a collection of popular hymns and spiritual songs of the time. This may or may not have been the first time the song appeared in English print, and the songwriter is unknown. Steel and Hulan suggest the song was derived from an 1816 German-language hymn, "Ich bin ja nur ein Gast auf Erden" by Isaac Niswander.

During and for several years after the American Civil War, the lyrics were known as the Libby Prison Hymn. This was because the words had been inscribed by a dying Union soldier incarcerated in Libby Prison, a warehouse converted to a notorious Confederate prison in Richmond, Virginia known for its adverse conditions and high death rate. It had been believed that the dying soldier had authored the song to comfort a disabled soldier, but this was not the case since it had been published several years before the Civil War in 1858, before Libby Prison was put into service (1862).

Members of the Western Writers of America chose it as one of the Top 100 Western songs of all time.

Notable versions

 It became one of Burl Ives' signature songs, included on his 1944 album The Wayfaring Stranger. Ives used it as the title of his early 1940s CBS radio show and his 1948 autobiography.
 Paul Robeson performed this song in his acclaimed 1945 and 1947 New York concerts. The son of a slave, Robeson performed the selection in a style reminiscent of the "Negro spirituals" of the 19th Century. The recording is featured with many other spirituals in the "Power and the Glory" collection. 
Jo Stafford features the song on her influential 1950 album American Folk Songs.
 Emmylou Harris covered the song on her 1980 album Roses in the Snow. Harris' version peaked at number 7 on the Billboard Hot Country Singles chart. It reached number 1 on the RPM Country Tracks chart in Canada.
 Another popular version of the song was released by Johnny Cash in 2000 as part of his album American III: Solitary Man.
 Jack White performed the song as his character Georgia in the 2003 film Cold Mountain and the song was included on the film's soundtrack.
Natalie Merchant recorded a version on her 2003 album The House Carpenter's Daughter.
The song is featured in the 2012 Belgian film The Broken Circle Breakdown.
 The song, referred to as "I Am a Poor Wayfaring Stranger", was featured in the 2019 World War I drama 1917. It was performed by actor and singer Jos Slovick. In February 2020, a Change.org petition collected over 2,500 signatures to urge film producers, Universal Pictures and DreamWorks Pictures to release a full studio version of Slovick's performance. The studio version was published in March 2020.
 For the soundtrack of the 2020 video game The Last of Us Part II, actors Ashley Johnson and Troy Baker, as their characters Ellie and Joel, performed the song over the end credits with additional lyrics.
 The Longest Johns in 2022 released a cover of the song as a part of their Smoke & Oakum album.
 The Tabernacle Choir at Temple Square recorded this song as part of their album Peace Like a River in an arrangement written by Mack Wilberg.

References

Further reading
 John F. Garst, Poor Wayfaring Stranger'—Early Publications," The Hymn [A Publication of the Hymn Society in the United States and Canada], vol. 31, no. 2, 1980, pp. 97–101

External links

 The Broadman Hymnal 1940 #74 Sheet music

American folk songs
Burl Ives songs
Emmylou Harris songs
Eva Cassidy songs
Glen Campbell songs
Gospel songs
Jack White songs
Joan Baez songs
Johnny Cash songs
Peter, Paul and Mary songs
Year of song unknown
Songwriter unknown